The Il-54 was a transonic bomber developed in the USSR in the 1950s. Only two examples were built before the project was abandoned.

Design and development
The Council of Ministers issued a directive to OKB-115, for a transonic bomber prototype to be submitted for State Acceptance Trials in July 1954. The design of this bomber went through several stages before settling on the final configuration.

The Il-54, as built, had a very thin 45 degree swept wing with anhedral, which was shoulder-mounted on the fuselage. The Lyulka AL-7 engines were housed in slim, pylon mounted, pods at approximately 1/3 span. Because the wings and engine nacelles were too small to house a conventional undercarriage, the Il-54 used a bicycle undercarriage arrangement, with nose and main gear units on the centreline of the aircraft, at each end of the bomb bay. This arrangement meant a conventional rotating takeoff would be impossible. To enable the Il-54 to take off, in a reasonable runway length, the main gear knelt and the nose gear extended to give the ideal angle of incidence for takeoff (10 degrees).

Flight trials of the Il-54 commenced in April 1955 with test pilot Vladimir Kokkinaki at the controls. Difficult handling during the landing run was rectified by modifying the undercarriage.

Production of the Il-54 was not proceeded with, due to competition from Yak-25 derivatives, and the belief that manned aircraft would soon be replaced by missiles.

Booked to fly in the flypast at Tushino Airfield in 1956, the Il-54 was dropped from the flying programme. The aircraft was then shown to a US military delegation at Kubinka. The delegation was told that the Il-54 was the Il-149, as part of a deception programme. As a result, the Il-54 was assigned far more importance than it actually warranted, and was assigned the NATO reporting name ("Blowlamp") after it had ceased flying.

Variants
Datafrom:OKB Ilyushin
 Il-54T - Torpedo Bomber (project)
 Il-54U - Trainer (project)
 Il-54R - Photo-Reconnaissance (project)

Specifications (Il-54)

See also

References

External links

 

1950s Soviet bomber aircraft
Abandoned military aircraft projects of the Soviet Union
Il-054
Twinjets
Aircraft first flown in 1955